Davidsonville Historic District is a national historic district at Davidsonville, Anne Arundel County, Maryland.  It is located around a rural crossroads at the intersection of Central Avenue (MD 214) and Davidsonville Road (MD 424). The district consists of fifteen properties: three churches, one commercial building, and eleven houses.  They represent the period from the village's initial settlement in about 1835 through the early 20th century.

It was listed on the National Register of Historic Places in 1992.

References

External links
, including photo from 1991, at Maryland Historical Trust
Boundary Map of the Davidsonville Historic District, Anne Arundel County, at Maryland Historical Trust

Historic districts on the National Register of Historic Places in Maryland
Historic districts in Anne Arundel County, Maryland
National Register of Historic Places in Anne Arundel County, Maryland